Fun Factory GmbH is a German manufacturer of erotic toys, specializing in silicone dildos, vibrators, and love balls. It is located in Bremen and all its manufacturing takes place in Germany. In 2006, the company had an annual revenue of 13.5 million euros. A daughter company exists in the United States and is distributed in the US by TNB Distribution.

In 2009 Fun Factory's Vibrator elLOVE (as a representative of its product line SMARTVIBES) received the highest possible rating in a test by German magazine , a magazine devoted to consumer-protection and ecology.

Several of Fun Factory's products received design awards, the Vibrator DeLight being among the most decorated: it received i.a. the red dot award product design 2008  and an IF (International Forum Design) product design award.

References

External links 

 

Companies based in Bremen
Sex toy manufacturers
Manufacturing companies based in Bremen (state)